Visit to Ukraine - is the first studio album of Sofia Rotaru, released by the APON label in 1975 in Canada and United States with 10 tracks. The album is one of the earliest releases of the singer abroad.

Track listing

History

Languages of performance 
Songs are performed in Ukrainian language.

See also 
 Canadian Tour 1983

External links 
 Official CD Discography of Sofia Rotaru
 "Fortuna" Fan Club

1975 albums
Sofia Rotaru albums